Methylheptane may refer to:

2-Methylheptane
3-Methylheptane
4-Methylheptane